The Republican River is a river in the central Great Plains of North America, rising in the High Plains of eastern Colorado and flowing east  through the U.S. states of Nebraska and Kansas.

Geography
The Republican River is formed by the confluence of the North Fork Republican River and the Arikaree River just north of Haigler in Dundy County, Nebraska.  It joins with the South Fork Republican River immediately southeast of Benkelman, Nebraska. All three tributaries originate in the High Plains of northeastern Colorado. From the confluence, the river flows generally eastward along the southern border of Nebraska, passing through Swanson Reservoir and Harlan County Reservoir before curving southward into the Smoky Hills region of Kansas. The Republican River joins the Smoky Hill River at Junction City, Kansas to form the Kansas River.

Some cities along the river are McCook, Nebraska, Clay Center, Kansas, Concordia, Kansas and Junction City, Kansas.  Near Concordia is the Republican River Pegram Truss, a bridge that goes over the Republican River that is listed on the National Register of Historic Places.

History
The river was named after a branch of Pawnee Indians known as "the Republicans".

As early as 1785, the Spanish and French had identified one of the villages of the Pawnee people as aldea de la Republica (little village of the Republic). A French traders' custom was to name rivers for the tribal villages located on their banks. In this way, the north fork of the Kansas River was named Fourche des Republiques or Fork of the Republics.

The Kitkehahkis Pawnee villages farmed corn, beans, and pumpkin in the fertile Republican valley floor but seasonally left to hunt buffalo in the plains to the west and south.

The Kitkehahkis, or Republican Pawnee, occasionally abandoned and relocated various villages along the Republican River.  In 1806, first the Spanish and then the Americans journeyed to the large Kitkehahkis village on Republican River, the Pike-Pawnee Village Site then near the present Guide Rock, Nebraska. Both parties were seeking the tribe's assistance in enforcing competing claims to the Louisiana Territory.  Leading the much smaller American expedition, Lieutenant Zebulon Pike convinced the Kitkehahkis to accept the American Flag in place of the Spanish.

In 1853, Fort Riley was established at the junction of the Republican with the Smoky Hill and Kansas Rivers. American settlement of the lower Republican River in began in the 1860s.

Prior to 1864, the Kansas River was publicly navigable under Kansas law. A side-wheel steamboat of 125 tons burden, Financier No. 2, reached the Republican River in 1855 and ascended it some 40 miles. However, in 1864, railroad interests passed a bill through the Kansas Legislature entitled, "An act declaring the Kansas, Republican, Smoky Hill, Solomon, and Big Blue rivers not navigable, and authorizing the bridging of the same." Railroads were thus permitted to bridge or dam the Republican as if it were never declared navigable.

The Kansas Pacific Railway reached the fork of the Republican in 1866, crossing into the Junction City town site.  The Junction City and Fort Kearney Railroad was constructed up the valley of the Republican to Clay Center in 1873.

 

The 1864 law was repealed in 1913; however, under Kansas Law, public access, whether for transport or recreation, is permitted only on publicly owned rivers. The State of Kansas owns only the Kansas and Arkansas Rivers as well as the portion of the Missouri River adjoining the northeastern corner of the state. As such, the limit of public river access is at the mouth of the Republican River. A public boat access ramp was opened on the mouth of the Republican River in 2009 just upstream of the railroad bridge, providing access to the upper end of the Kansas River National Water Trail, a part of the National Water Trail program.

Milford Lake, the largest man-made lake in Kansas, was completed on the Republican in 1967.

Republican River Compact
Allocation of the water from the Republican River is governed through an agreement called the Republican River Compact, involving the states of Nebraska, Kansas and Colorado, as modified by the settlement of a United States Supreme Court case (Kansas vs. Nebraska and Colorado) involving a water-use dispute under the Compact.

Major flooding

July 1902
On July 9, 1902, the river flooded near Concordia, Kansas, breaking a dam and re-routing the river by a quarter-mile (about half a kilometer).

May/June 1935
This storm was also unique in that it moved in the same direction as the drainage basin. As a result, the Frenchman, Red Willow, Medicine, Deer, Muddy, and Turkey creeks all reached their flood peaks at the same time as the crest passed on the Republican River.

Many survivors also reported that there were two crests - the water came up on May 28, then receded slightly, but the second crest on June 1 greatly exceeded the first. At one point, the water rose  in 30 minutes and was  higher than the previous record crest. One eyewitness said the water level rose in some places at 10 miles per hour or more. Another account states that the Republican rose  in 12 minutes in McCook, destroying the structures in its path.

Estimates show 113 people killed. From 11,400 to 41,500 head of cattle were killed; one report said that carcasses littering the roads made them impassable.

See also 

 List of Kansas rivers
 List of Nebraska rivers

References

External links

 Republican River Compact Compliance, State of Colorado
 The Republican River, A 2018 survey of the political and social ecology of the Republican River by Denis Boyles

Rivers of Kansas
Rivers of Nebraska
Bodies of water of Nuckolls County, Nebraska
Bodies of water of Webster County, Nebraska
Bodies of water of Franklin County, Nebraska
Bodies of water of Harlan County, Nebraska
Bodies of water of Furnas County, Nebraska
Bodies of water of Red Willow County, Nebraska
Bodies of water of Hitchcock County, Nebraska
Bodies of water of Dundy County, Nebraska
Tributaries of the Kansas River
Bodies of water of Clay County, Kansas
Bodies of water of Cloud County, Kansas
Rivers of Geary County, Kansas